Freemasonry in Suffolk dates back to 1772 when the Suffolk "Province" was founded. In 2008 the current Provincial Grand Master of Suffolk, Barry ross, claimed they had 3,000 members organised in 66 lodges. They operate out of 21 centres, he added. The Freemasons' Hall was built in Soane Street, Ipswich in 1897. It is a grade II listed building run by the Ipswich Masonic Hall Trust.

In accordance with the Suffolk Code, councillors in Suffolk are asked to declare whether they are a Freemason.

History

Ipswich Royal Ark Masons
There are claims that Royal Ark Masons started in Ipswich in 1772, but the documentary evidence only goes back as far as 1789, when Ebenezer "Noah" Sibley and a Mr Wood arrived in Ipswich. The group is sometimes described as "irregular" or "quasi-masonic", as it was formed in order to have a political impact.

United Grand Lodge of England
In 1886 Robert Adair, 1st Baron Waveney was the United Grand Lodge of England Provincial Grand Master of Suffolk until his death on 15 February. There were over 800 freemasons in Suffolk distributed in 22 craft lodges:

→

Masonic buildings in Suffolk

References

Freemasonry in England
Suffolk articles